Beren Gökyıldız  (born 29 September 2009) is a Turkish child actress. She is mainly known for her role as Ayşe in the television series Bizim Hikaye.

Biography 
Beren was born on 29 September 2009 in Istanbul. She is continuing her education at primary school. She started her acting career by appearing on Fox TV's series Kocamın Ailesi, and won the favor of the audience with her character.

Despite her young age, she was able to give a successful performance and later appeared on Show TV's Güldüy Güldüy Show. She then got a role on Star TV's series Anne as Melek Akçay, and shared the leading role with Vahide Perçin and Cansu Dere.

Filmography

Awards

References

External links

Living people
2009 births
Actresses from Istanbul
Turkish child actresses
Turkish television actresses
Turkish film actresses
21st-century Turkish actresses